1982 in sports describes the year's events in world sport.

Alpine skiing
 Alpine Skiing World Cup:
 Men's overall season champion: Phil Mahre, United States
 Women's overall season champion: Erika Hess, Switzerland

American football
 Super Bowl XVI – the San Francisco 49ers (NFC) won 26–21 over the Cincinnati Bengals (AFC)
Location: Pontiac Silverdome
Attendance: 81,270
MVP: Joe Montana, QB (San Francisco)
 Orange Bowl (1981 season):
 The Clemson Tigers won 22-15 over the Nebraska Cornhuskers to win the college football national championship
 Strike – First regular season strike by NFL players ends on November 16 after 57 days.

Association football
 World Cup in Spain – Italy beats West Germany 3-1 for their third title.
 Champions' Cup – Aston Villa 1-0 Bayern München
 UEFA Cup – Two legs; 1st leg IFK Göteborg 1-0 Hamburger SV; 2nd leg Hamburger SV 0-3 IFK Göteborg. IFK Göteborg won 4-0 on aggregate. 66 fans died in the Luzhniki disaster during the UEFA Cup second round match between FC Spartak Moscow and HFC Haarlem in Moscow on 20 October.
 Cup Winners' Cup – Barcelona 2-1 Standard Liège
 Super Cup – Two legs; 1st leg Barcelona 1-0 Aston Villa; 2nd leg Aston Villa 3-0 Barcelona. Aston Villa won 3-1 on aggregate
 Copa Libertadores de América – Two legs; 1st leg Peñarol 0-0 Cobreloa; 2nd leg Cobreloa 0-1 Peñarol. Peñarol win 1-0 on aggregate
 England – FA Cup – Tottenham Hotspur won 1-0 over Queens Park Rangers

Athletics
 September – 1982 European Athletics Championships held in Athens
 October – 1982 Commonwealth Games held in Brisbane, Australia
 December – 1982 Asian Games held in New Delhi, India

Australian rules football
 Victorian Football League
 Carlton wins the 86th VFL Premiership (Carlton 14.19 (103) d Richmond 12.13 (83))
 Brownlow Medal awarded to Brian Wilson (Melbourne)
 The inaugural VFL Players Association Most Valuable Player Award goes to Leigh Matthews (Hawthorn). The award would be renamed the Leigh Matthews Trophy in his honour in 2002.

Baseball
 March 27 – KBO League, a professional baseball league in South Korea, a first officially game held.
 May 30 – Cal Ripken Jr. of the Baltimore Orioles plays the first of what will become a record-breaking 2,632 consecutive games 
 July 13 – Montreal hosts the first MLB All-Star Game outside the United States. Reds SS Dave Concepción hits a 2-run home run in the 2nd inning to spark the National League to its 11th consecutive win over the American League 4-1. The NL has now won 19 of the last 20 contests. Concepción was named the MVP.
 August 18 – Pete Rose sets record with his 13,941st plate appearance.
 World Series – St. Louis Cardinals won 4 games to 3 over the Milwaukee Brewers to claim their first World Championship since 1967. The Series MVP was Cardinals catcher Darrell Porter.
 The Salem Angels won the Northwest League championship.

Basketball
 NCAA Men's Basketball Championship –
 North Carolina wins 63-62 over Georgetown
 NCAA Division I Women's Basketball Championship
 Louisiana Tech wins 76–62 over Cheyney State
 NBA Finals –
 Los Angeles Lakers won 4 games to 2 over the Philadelphia 76ers
 National Basketball League (Australia) Finals:
 West Adelaide Bearcats defeated the Geelong Cats 80-74 in the final.
 FIBA World Championship
 USSR World Champion

Boxing
 May 4 to May 15 – 1982 World Amateur Boxing Championships held in Munich
 June 11 – Larry Holmes defeats Gerry Cooney for the WBC Heavyweight title. Cooney, a white challenger, was dubbed "The White Hope" in what built up to be a very racially toned fight: see Larry Holmes vs. Gerry Cooney.
 November 12 – Aaron Pryor defeats Alexis Argüello in what would later be called the fight of the decade. Pryor retained the WBA's world Jr. Welterweight title with a 14th round knockout
 November 13 – Ray Mancini defeats Duk Koo Kim by knockout in 14 rounds in a tragic fight. Kim died four days later and the fight's outcome brought many new resolutions to boxing.
 December 3 – The Carnival of Champions; Wilfredo Gomez defeats Lupe Pintor by a 14th round knockout and Thomas Hearns defeats Wilfred Benitez by a 15 rounds majority decision; all four boxers are later enshrined as members of the International Boxing Hall of Fame.

Canadian football
 Grey Cup – Edmonton Eskimos won 32–16 over the Toronto Argonauts, the Eskimos' record fifth consecutive Grey Cup victory.
 Vanier Cup – UBC Thunderbirds won 39–14 over the Western Ontario Mustangs

Cricket
 Graham Gooch leads a "rebel" team of players on tour of South Africa, banned from official cricket since 1970 because of apartheid.

Cycling
 Giro d'Italia won by Bernard Hinault of France
 Tour de France – Bernard Hinault of France
 UCI Road World Championships – Men's road race – Giuseppe Saronni of Italy

Dogsled racing
 Iditarod Trail Sled Dog Race Champion –
 Rick Swenson won with lead sled dog – Andy

Field hockey
 Men's World Cup held in Bombay won by Pakistan
 Men's Champions Trophy held at Amstelveen in the Netherlands and won by the host nation

Figure skating
 World Figure Skating Championship –
 Men's champion: Scott Hamilton, United States
 Ladies' champion: Elaine Zayak, United States
 Pair skating champions: Sabine Baeß & Tassilo Thierbach, Germany
 Ice dancing champions: Jayne Torvill & Christopher Dean, Great Britain

Gaelic Athletic Association
 Camogie
 All-Ireland Camogie Champion: Cork
 National Camogie League: Kilkenny
 Gaelic football
 All-Ireland Senior Football Championship – Offaly 1-15 died Kerry 0-17
 National Football League – Kerry 1-9 died Cork 0-5 (replay)
 Ladies' Gaelic football
 All-Ireland Senior Football Champion: Kerry
 National Football League: Kerry
 Hurling
 All-Ireland Senior Hurling Championship – Kilkenny 3-18 died Cork 1-13
 National Hurling League – Kilkenny 2–14 beat Wexford 1–11

Golf
Men's professional
 Masters Tournament – Craig Stadler
 U.S. Open – Tom Watson
 British Open – Tom Watson
 PGA Championship – Raymond Floyd
 PGA Tour money leader – Craig Stadler – $446,462
 Senior PGA Tour money leader – Miller Barber – $106,890
Men's amateur
 British Amateur – Martin Thompson
 U.S. Amateur – Jay Sigel
Women's professional
 LPGA Championship – Jan Stephenson
 U.S. Women's Open – Janet Anderson
 Classique Peter Jackson Classic – Sandra Haynie
 LPGA Tour money leader – JoAnne Carner – $310,400

Harness racing
 United States Pacing Triple Crown races –
 Cane Pace – Cam Fella
 Little Brown Jug – Merger
 Messenger Stakes – Cam Fella
 United States Trotting Triple Crown races –
 Hambletonian – Speed Bowl
 Yonkers Trot – Mystic Park
 Kentucky Futurity – Jazz Cosmos
 Australian Inter Dominion Harness Racing Championship –
 Pacers: Rhett's Law

Horse racing
Steeplechases
 Cheltenham Gold Cup – Silver Buck
 Grand National – Grittar
Flat races
 Australia – Melbourn Cup won by Gurner's Lane
 Canada – Queen's Plate won by Son of Briartic
 France – Prix de l'Arc de Triomphe won by Akiyda
 Ireland – Irish Derby Stakes won by Assert
 Japan – Japan Cup won by Half Iced
 English Triple Crown Races:
 2,000 Guineas Stakes – Zino
 The Derby – Golden Fleece
 St. Leger Stakes – Touching Wood
 United States Triple Crown Races:
 Kentucky Derby – Gato Del Sol
 1982 Preakness Stakes – Aloma's Ruler
 Belmont Stakes – Conquistador Cielo

Ice hockey
 Art Ross Trophy as the NHL's leading scorer during the regular season: Wayne Gretzky, Edmonton Oilers
 Hart Memorial Trophy for the NHL's Most Valuable Player: Wayne Gretzky, Edmonton Oilers
 Stanley Cup – New York Islanders win 4-0 over the Vancouver Canucks
 World Hockey Championship –
 Men's champion: Soviet Union defeated Czechoslovakia
 Junior Men's champion: Canada defeated Czechoslovakia

Motorsport

Rugby league
1982 Kangaroo tour of Great Britain and France
1982 KB Cup
1982 New Zealand rugby league season
1982 NSWRFL season – Parramatta Eels win their second title, defeating Manly-Warringah Sea Eagles 21-8 in the final.
1981–82 Rugby Football League season / 1982–83 Rugby Football League season
1982 State of Origin series

Rugby union
 88th Five Nations Championship series is won by Ireland

Snooker
 World Snooker Championship – Alex Higgins beats Ray Reardon 18-15
 World rankings – Ray Reardon becomes world number one for 1982/83

Swimming
 The fourth FINA World Championships held in Guayaquil, Ecuador

Tennis
 Grand Slam in tennis men's results:
 Australian Open – Johan Kriek
 French Open – Mats Wilander
 Wimbledon championships – Jimmy Connors
 U.S. Open – Jimmy Connors
 Grand Slam in tennis women's results:
 Australian Open – Chris Evert
 French Open – Martina Navratilova
 Wimbledon championships – Martina Navratilova
 U.S. Open – Chris Evert
 Davis Cup – United States won 4-1 over France in world tennis.
 Billie Jean King makes her final singles appearance at the US Open, losing in the first round.
 Total prize money at US Open exceeds 1 million US dollars.

Volleyball
 1982 FIVB Men's World Championship held in Buenos Aires, Argentina won by USSR
 1982 FIVB Women's World Championship held in Lima, Peru won by China

Water polo
 Men's World Championship held in Guayaquil, Ecuador, won by USSR

Multi-sport events
 Asian Games held in New Delhi, India
 Central American and Caribbean Games held in Havana, Cuba
 Commonwealth Games held in Brisbane, Australia

Awards
 Associated Press Male Athlete of the Year – Wayne Gretzky, NHL ice hockey
 Associated Press Female Athlete of the Year – Mary Decker, Track and field
 ABC's Wide World of Sports Athlete of the Year: Wayne Gretzky

References

 
Sports by year